Firda Upper Secondary School is a school located in the town of Sandane in the municipality of Gloppen in Sogn og Fjordane county, Norway.  The highway  passes just north of the school.
The school features in the NRK series Lovleg.

In 1927, Kaare Fostervoll who was later director-general of the Norwegian Broadcasting Corporation was a headmaster here from 1927–1938.

References

External links
 The official web page of Firda Upper Secondary School

Secondary schools in Norway
Sogn og Fjordane County Municipality